Siviwe Gidana (born 7 August 1987) is a South African cricketer. He made his first-class debut for Eastern Province in the 2008–09 Provincial Three-Day Challenge on 5 February 2009. He made his List A debut for Eastern Province in the 2008–09 Provincial One-Day Challenge on 8 February 2009.

References

External links
 

1987 births
Living people
South African cricketers
Eastern Province cricketers
Place of birth missing (living people)